Henry Luesing Brooks (December 9, 1905 – December 30, 1971) was a United States circuit judge of the United States Court of Appeals for the Sixth Circuit and previously a United States district judge of the United States District Court for the Western District of Kentucky.

Education and career

Born in Louisville, Kentucky, Brooks received an Artium Baccalaureus degree from the University of Wisconsin in 1927 and a Bachelor of Laws from the Jefferson School of Law (now the University of Louisville School of Law in 1929. He was in private practice in Louisville from 1929 to 1954. He was a United States Naval Reserve Lieutenant during World War II, from 1942 to 1945. He was a judge of the Jefferson County Circuit Court from 1946 to 1948, and was then a member of the faculty of the Jefferson School of Law from 1948 to 1952.

Federal judicial service

On August 16, 1954, Brooks was nominated by President Dwight D. Eisenhower to a new seat on the United States District Court for the Western District of Kentucky created by 68 Stat. 8. He was confirmed by the United States Senate on August 18, 1954, and received his commission on August 21, 1954. He served as Chief Judge from 1960 to 1969. His service terminated on December 12, 1969, due to his elevation to the Sixth Circuit.

On August 13, 1969, President Richard Nixon nominated Brooks for elevation to a new seat on the United States Court of Appeals for the Sixth Circuit created by 82 Stat. 184. The Senate confirmed Brooks to the Sixth Circuit on December 10, 1969, and he received his commission on December 11, 1969. Brooks served in that capacity until his death on December 30, 1971, in Louisville.

References

Sources
 

1905 births
1971 deaths
Judges of the United States District Court for the Western District of Kentucky
United States district court judges appointed by Dwight D. Eisenhower
20th-century American judges
Judges of the United States Court of Appeals for the Sixth Circuit
United States court of appeals judges appointed by Richard Nixon
United States Navy officers
Lawyers from Louisville, Kentucky
20th-century American lawyers
University of Louisville School of Law alumni